The Shastri Nagar (formerly called Vivekanandapuri) metro station is located on the Red Line of the Delhi Metro.

Station layout

Facilities

List of available ATM at Shastri Nagar metro station are

See also
List of Delhi Metro stations
Transport in Delhi
Delhi Metro Rail Corporation
Delhi Suburban Railway
List of rapid transit systems in India
Delhi Transport Corporation
List of Metro Systems

References

External links

 Delhi Metro Rail Corporation Ltd. (Official site)
 Delhi Metro Annual Reports
 
 UrbanRail.Net – descriptions of all metro systems in the world, each with a schematic map showing all stations.

one and half an hour distance from Nehru Place

Delhi Metro stations
Railway stations opened in 2003
Railway stations in North Delhi district
Memorials to Lal Bahadur Shastri